Events in the year 1961 in Norway.

Incumbents
 Monarch – Olav V
 Prime Minister – Einar Gerhardsen (Labour Party)

Events

 12 January – Princess Astrid marries Johan Martin Ferner.
 March – Ingrid Bjerkås, ordained as first female minister in the Church of Norway
 15 April – The Socialist People's Party was founded.
 9 August – Holtaheia Accident: A British passenger plane crashes in Strand. All 39 passengers aboard, including 34 children, are killed.
 11 September – The 1961 Parliamentary election takes place.

Popular culture

Sports

Music

Film

Literature

Notable births

January 
 
 

2 January – Ole Bremseth, ski jumper.
4 January – Kristin Kloster Aasen, sports leader.
7 January – Irene Johansen, politician
8 January – Tore Hagebakken, politician.
11 January 
Carl Morten Amundsen, dramaturg and theatre director
Vegard Opaas, ski jumper.
13 January – Sinikka Langeland, traditional folk singer and musician.
15 January – Guttorm Schjelderup, economist.
16 January – Kenneth Sivertsen, guitarist, singer and composer (died 2006).
18 January – Linn Siri Jensen, handball goalkeeper and coach.
29 January – Per Axel Koch, media executive.

February 
 

3 February – Karoline Frogner, filmmaker, photographer and writer.
4 February 
 Kristin Midthun, handball player.
 Kari Veiteberg, bishop.
12 February – Knut Reiersrud, blues guitarist.
14 February – Raymond Johansen, politician.
21 February – Per Arne Olsen, politician.
22 February (in Switzerland) – Rolf Thorsen, competition rower.
24 February – Erna Solberg, Prime Minister.
28 February – Bjørn-Inge Larsen, physician and civil servant.

March 
 
 

3 March  
Anita Hegerland, singer
Knut Nærum, comedian, author and comics writer.
6 March – Knut Hjeltnes, architect.
7 March – Øystein Jarlsbo, ice hockey player.
8 March – Odd W. Surén, writer.
12 March – Erik Kristiansen, ice hockey player.
18 March  
Ingvild Bryn, journalist and news anchor
Kyrre Nakkim, journalist
19 March – Rune Bratseth, footballer.
22  March 
 Arne Bergseng, ice hockey player.
 Bente Pedersen, novelist.
23 March 
 Eivind Aarset, guitarist.
 Jørgen Sigurd Lien, software developer
24 March – Henning Warloe, politician.
28 March 
Herborg Finnset, bishop.
Åsne Havnelid, businessperson and sports official.
30 March – Per Arne Nilsen, sailor.

April 
 

6 April – Dag Hopen, cyclist.
12 April 
 Henry Nilsen, speed skater.
 Torfinn Opheim, politician.
22 April – Atle Norstad, bobsledder.
25 April – Truls Mørk, cellist.
29 April  – Pål Gunnar Mikkelsplass, cross-country skier.

May 
 

5 May – Tore Johnsen, athlete.
6 May – Geir Bergkastet, cultural director.
9 May – Odd Reidar Humlegård, civil servant.
12 May – André Krogsæter, footballer.
23 May – Pål Brekke, astrophysicist
30 May – Erik Thyness, judge.
31 May – Ove Lemicka, politician.

June 

5 June – Kjetil Osvold, footballer.
9 June – Ragnhild Bratberg, orienteering competitor and a cross country skier.
21 June – Rolf Morgan Hansen, cyclist.
22 June – Asbjørn Schaathun, composer.
26 June – Kari Ofstad, canoeist.
28 June – Ann-Magrit Austenå, journalist and organizational leader.

July 
 

8 July – Karl Seglem, jazz musician.
12 July – Espen Andersen, Nordic combined skier.
13 July 
 John Hugo Pedersen, ice hockey player.
 Kjetil Rolness, sociologist  and writer.
23 July – Akhtar Chaudhry, politician.
25 July 
 Johan H. Andresen Jr., industrialist and investor.
 Petter Thoresen, ice hockey player.

August 
 

1 August – Marianne Andreassen, civil servant.
12 August 
 Kristin Krohn Devold, politician.
 Ingrid Heggø, politician.
19 August – Frank Vestreng, ice hockey player.
27 August 
 Anders Giæver, journalist.
 Margit Tveiten, diplomat.
28 August – Kim Leine, writer.
29 August – Signy Fardal, magazine editor.

September 
 

6 September – Paul Waaktaar-Savoy, A-ha lead guitarist
8 September – Espen Borge, middle-distance runner.
11 September – Birgit Oline Kjerstad, politician.
13 September – Leif Johan Sevland, politician.
18 September – Linn Stokke, actress, singer and writer.
25 September – Fridtjof Thoen, judoka.

October 
 

3 October – Bård Eker, industrial designer.
6 October – Ib Thomsen, politician.
8 October – Rune Lorentsen, wheelchair curler.
18 October – Rolf Einar Fife, diplomat.
20 October – Audun Kleive, jazz drummer.
21 October – Arve Lønnum Jr., politician.
24 October – Gunnar Stavrum, newspaper editor.
27 October – Mia Gundersen, singer and actress.

November 
 

4 November – Olaug Bollestad, politician.
12 November – Tomas Espedal, writer.
20 November – Ingeborg Midttømme, bishop.
24 November – Brit Pettersen, cross-country skier.

December 
 

3 December – Dag Usterud, sailor.
14 December – Guri Schanke, singer and actress.
16 December – Anders B. Werp, politician.
19 December – Anne Kristine Linnestad, politician.
25 December – Grete Ingeborg Nykkelmo, biathlete and cross-country skier.
30 December – Rolf Lislevand, lute player.

Full date missing 
 Espen Bergh, judge.
 Leiv Lunde, politician.
Cecilie Mauritzen, oceanographer.
Rune Rebne, composer.

Notable deaths

23 January – Andreas Baalsrud, engineer (b. 1872)
13 March – Lise Lindbæk, war correspondent (b. 1905)
27 March – Jacob Pedersen, track and field athlete (b. 1889)
2 April – Arne Torolf Strøm, politician (b. 1901)
26 April – Anna Sethne, educator (born 1872).
2 May – Petter Jamvold, sailor and Olympic gold medallist (b. 1899)
24 May – Rachel Grepp, journalist and politician (b. 1879) 
7 June – Harald Gram, jurist, politician and genealogist (b. 1887)
8 June – Olav Bjaaland, ski champion and polar explorer (b. 1873)
9 June – Arnstein Arneberg, architect (b.1882)
30 June – Lars Sverkeson Romundstad, politician (b. 1885)
14 August – Thomas Aas, sailor and Olympic gold medallist (b. 1887)
16 September – Johanne Samueline Pedersen, politician (b. 1887)
17 September – Henrik Ameln, jurist and politician (b. 1879)
25 September – Olav Gullvåg, playwright, novelist, poet and editor (b. 1885) 
3 October – Anne Grimdalen, sculptor (b. 1899)
17 October – Jens Olai Steffensen, politician (b. 1891)
9 November – Ferdinand Bie, long jumper and Olympic gold medallist (b. 1888).
13 November – Herman Smitt Ingebretsen, politician (b. 1891)
21 November – Hjalmar Olai Storeide, politician (b. 1901)
22 November – Ole Hallesby, Lutheran neo-orthodox pietist (b. 1879)
4 December – Ingvar Wedervang, economist and statistician (b. 1891)
12 December – Hauk Aabel, comedian and actor (b. 1867)
26 December – Kristofer Uppdal, poet and author (b. 1878)

Full date unknown
Haakon Hauan, politician and Minister (b.1871)
Lars Høgvold, ski jumper (b.1888)
Kristian Løken, military officer (b.1884)
Niels Nielsen, sailor and Olympic silver medallist (b.1883)
Vaadjuv Nyqvist, sailor and Olympic silver medallist (b.1902)
Arnold Rørholt, military officer (b.1884)
Olav Martinus Knutsen Steinnes, politician and Minister (b.1886)

See also

References

External links